In Greek mythology, Eurymēdē (Ancient Greek: Εὐρυμήδη or Εὐρυμέδη, Eurumēdē, "lady with wide-ranging thoughts") may refer to the following characters:
 Eurymēdē, mother by Glaucus of Bellerophon and possibly Deliades (Alcimenes or Piren). Otherwise, she was called Eurynome.
 Eurymēdē, a Aetolian princess as daughter of King Oeneus of Calydon and Althaea, daughter of King Thestius of Pleuron. She was one of the sisters of Meleager that are called Meleagrides and who, grieving much the death of their brother, were turned into birds by Artemis. Eurymede's other siblings were Deianeira, Toxeus, Clymenus, Periphas, Agelaus (or Ageleus), Thyreus (or Phereus or Pheres), Gorge and Melanippe.

Notes

References 

 Antoninus Liberalis, The Metamorphoses of Antoninus Liberalis translated by Francis Celoria (Routledge 1992). Online version at the Topos Text Project.
Apollodorus, The Library with an English Translation by Sir James George Frazer, F.B.A., F.R.S. in 2 Volumes, Cambridge, MA, Harvard University Press; London, William Heinemann Ltd. 1921. . Online version at the Perseus Digital Library. Greek text available from the same website.

 Gaius Julius Hyginus, Fabulae from The Myths of Hyginus translated and edited by Mary Grant. University of Kansas Publications in Humanistic Studies. Online version at the Topos Text Project.
Hesiod, Catalogue of Women from Homeric Hymns, Epic Cycle, Homerica translated by Evelyn-White, H G. Loeb Classical Library Volume 57. London: William Heinemann, 1914. Online version at theio.com

Princesses in Greek mythology